9X Jhakaas is the first Marathi music channel, broadcasting from Mumbai, Maharashtra. This channel was launched on 31 October 2011. It now also available worldwide via the internet.

The channel is operated by 9X Media, which also operates the Hindi language music channel 9XM, another channel called 9X Jalwa, and the Punjabi music channel 9x Tashan.

References

External links

Marathi-language television channels
Television stations in Mumbai
9X Media
Music television channels in India